Sophia Thomalla (born 6 October 1989) is a German actress, model, and television presenter.

Early life 
Thomalla was born in East Berlin, East Germany on 6 October 1989, the daughter of actors Simone Thomalla and André Vetters. She grew up in Berlin until she was seven and moved to Cologne with her mother. After completing her fourth year of school, she and her mother moved to Kleinmachnow, then to Gelsenkirchen a year later. She also lived there after the separation of her mother from Rudi Assauer. Like her mother, Thomalla practised kickboxing as a recreational sport; she also partook in some amateur fights.

Career 
From 2007 to 2009, Thomalla attended the Constantin School for Acting, Dance and Singing in Bochum. In 2006, she played her first television role as the daughter of Barbara Rudnik and Henry Hübchen with TV director Sigi Rothemund in the ARD crime series Commissario Laurenti.

In 2009, she applied for an open casting for the model casting show Germany's Next Topmodel. In 2009 and 2010, she appeared in the Sat.1 daily soap Eine wie Keine ("One Like No Other") with Chris Putzer. She was a candidate at Let's Dance and won the title of Dancing Star 2010, together with her dance partner Massimo Sinató. In 2012, Thomalla appeared in the ensemble of the comedy series Die Dreisten Drei on Sat.1, alongside Oliver Beerhenke and Mirco Nontschew.

In 2010, she was ranked third in the list of FHM's Sexiest Women. Like her mother, Thomalla was photographed for the German edition of Playboy, with the pictures released in May 2012. Thomalla won first place in the online selection of Die 25 schönsten Stars in 25 Jahren ("The 25 Most Beautiful Stars in 25 Years"). In the October 2015 edition of Playboy, Thomalla was portrayed together with her mother and 23 other women, including Christine Theiss, Tina Ruland, Regina Halmich, Katarina Witt, Charlotte Engelhardt, and Miriam Gössner. 

In 2014, she advertised for the cosmetic product line of the discounter Lidl and the following year for its fashion brand. She took over additional hosting at the Wok World Cup broadcast on ProSieben in March and at the TV total Stock Car Crash Challenge in October 2015. On 30 January 2015, Thomalla hosted the 10th SemperOpernball in Dresden alongside Gunther Emmerlich. On 2 March 2015, she appeared on the talk show Hart aber Fair ("Tough but Fair"), which dealt with the issue of gender equality. She was heavily criticized for her appearance on the show. On 8 September 2015, the issue of equality at Hart aber Fair in the same cast, supplemented by two other guests, was discussed again.

In 2016, Thomalla was part of the jury of the RTL dance show Dance Dance Dance, alongside DJ BoBo and Cale Kalay. Later that year, she was on the jury of the tattoo show Pain & Fame on Sixx, where the best tattoo artists in Germany competed. In September 2016, she brought out a shoe collection.

In December 2017, there was criticism for a promotional photo for a gambling provider. Thomalla was scarcely clothed tied to a cross. The President of the Central Committee of German Catholics and the Cultural Commissioner of the Evangelical Church criticized the photo.

In the talk show Maischberger, Thomalla said about the #MeToo campaign: "I think the campaign is an insult to the true rape victims." These incidents and other comments about the #MeToo campaign sparked criticism.

Personal life 
In late 2009, Thomalla moved back to Berlin where she grew up, and to Potsdam a year later.

She has been a supporter of the Christian Democratic Union of Germany (CDU) political party since 2012.

Thomalla dated Rammstein singer Till Lindemann from April 2011 to November 2015. On 11 March 2016, she married Norwegian singer Andy LaPlegua in Marietta, Georgia. In May 2017, she announced their divorce. From 2017 until 2018, Thomalla was in a relationship with British musician Gavin Rossdale.  In March 2019, she began dating German goalkeeper Loris Karius with whom she later moved to Istanbul, Turkey, where he was playing football. Since 2021, Thomalla has been dating German tennis player Alexander Zverev.

Filmography 

 2006–2009: Commissario Laurenti (TV series, 5 episodes)
 2008: Unser Charly (TV series, episode: Mit allen Tricks)
 2009: Zeit der Entscheidung – Die Soap deiner Wahl (Internet soap opera, one episode)
 2009–2010: Eine wie keine (TV series, 3 episodes)
 2010: Hanni & Nanni
 2010: Countdown – Die Jagd beginnt (TV series, episode: Vom Himmel gefallen)
 2010–2013: Der Bergdoktor (TV series, 44 episodes)
 2011: 90 Minuten – Das Berlin Projekt
 2011: Der letzte Bulle (TV series, episode: Mord auf Seite 1)
 2011: Die Trixxer
 2012: Die Dreisten Drei – jetzt noch dreister
 2013: Alarm für Cobra 11 – Die Autobahnpolizei (TV series, episode: Alleingang)
 2015:

References

External links 

 

Christian Democratic Union of Germany politicians
German film actresses
1989 births
Actresses from Berlin
Actors from Cologne
21st-century German actresses
German television actresses
Living people
German soap opera actresses
ProSieben people